Brendon Crooks (born 17 August 1971) is a New Zealand judoka. He competed in the men's extra-lightweight event at the 2000 Summer Olympics.

References

External links
 

1971 births
Living people
New Zealand male judoka
Olympic judoka of New Zealand
Judoka at the 2000 Summer Olympics
Sportspeople from Auckland